Clypeobarbus schoutedeni is a species of cyprinid fish endemic to the Democratic Republic of the Congo where it is only known from the Dungu River.  This species can reach a length of  TL.

References 

Clypeobarbus
Taxa named by Max Poll
Fish described in 1961
Endemic fauna of the Democratic Republic of the Congo